was a Japanese essayist and novelist. His work focused on movies and Osamu Dazai.

He was born in Aomori Prefecture, where Dazai was also born. He also once directed a movie.

He won the Naoki Prize in 1973 for Tsugaru jongara bushi and Tsugaru yosare bushi.

He was awarded a Medal of Honor (with Purple Ribbon, for contributions to education and culture) from the Japanese government in 2002.

Bibliography

Fiction
Tsugaru jongara bushi
Tsugaru yosare bushi
Tenno no Tanjo, Eigateki Kojiki

Essays
Cherry and Christ, another history of Osamu Dazai

Filmography
Festival of Dream (夢の祭り Yume no Matsuri) (director and writer)
a movie about a shamisen player

See also
Closet screenplay

References

1934 births
2018 deaths
Japanese essayists
People from Hirosaki
20th-century essayists
20th-century Japanese novelists
21st-century essayists
21st-century Japanese novelists
Naoki Prize winners